The Berrouaghia prison massacre is alleged to have taken place on 14 November 1994, after an escape attempt at Algeria's Berrouaghia prison. Estimates of the death toll vary wildly. The government gave the figure of eight dead, while others placed the death toll at 30 or higher, and El Watan later gave a figure of 200.

See also
List of massacres in Algeria

References

External links
 HRW
 Amnesty
 El Watan

Algerian massacres of the 1990s
Conflicts in 1994
Massacres in 1994
Algerian war crimes
November 1994 events in Africa
Prison massacres